Maximilian Josef Sommer (born June 26, 1934) is a retired German-American stage, television, and film actor.

Early life
He was born in Greifswald, Germany, and raised in North Carolina, the son of Elisabeth and Clemens Sommer, a professor of Art History at the University of North Carolina. He studied at the Carnegie Institute of Technology. He has a daughter, Maria.

Career
Sommer made his acting debut at the age of nine in a North Carolina production of Watch on the Rhine. He made his film debut in Dirty Harry (1971) and appeared in films such as The Stepford Wives (1975), Close Encounters of the Third Kind (1977), Still of the Night (1982), Silkwood (1983), Peter Weir's thriller Witness (1985) opposite Harrison Ford (where he played a dirty cop), Target (1985), Malice (1993), Patch Adams (1998), and X-Men: The Last Stand (2006). He appeared as President Gerald Ford opposite Gena Rowlands in the TV movie The Betty Ford Story (1987). In 1974, he appeared in the role of Roy Mills on The Guiding Light, and played George Barton in the 1983 TV version of Agatha Christie's Sparkling Cyanide. He had starring roles in two short-lived series: Hothouse (1988) and Under Cover (1991). As of 2007, he had appeared in almost 100 films. Some of his more famous roles were as a crooked businessman or a corrupt politician.  Sommer displayed humanity without being seen on screen when he lent his talents as the poignant narrator in Sophie's Choice (1982).

He played a rare leading role—opposite the titular-titled, eponymous character played by Sylvia Kristel—as the film noir-esque detective in the quirky horror comedy Dracula's Widow (1988).

Filmography

 1971 Dirty Harry as District Attorney William T. Rothko
 1972 The Witches of Salem: The Horror and the Hope (short film)
 1974 Man on a Swing as Pete Russell
 1975 The Stepford Wives as Ted Van Sant 
 1975 Valley Forge (TV) as Brigadier General 'Dusty' Varnum
 1976 The Adams Chronicles (TV) as Charles Lee
 1977 Close Encounters of the Third Kind as Larry Butler
 1978 Oliver's Story as Dr. Dienhart
 1980 Hide in Plain Sight as Jason R. Reid
 1981 Absence of Malice as McAdam
 1981 Reds as State Department Official
 1981 Rollover as Roy Lefcourt
 1982 Hanky Panky as Adrian Pruitt
 1982 Still of the Night as George Bynum
 1982 Sophie's Choice as Narrator (voice)
 1983 Independence Day as Sam Taylor
 1983 Silkwood as Max Richter
 1984 Iceman as Whitman
 1985 Witness as Chief Paul Schaeffer
 1985 D.A.R.Y.L. as Dr. Jeffrey Stewart
 1985 Target as Taber
 1986 Scarecrow and Mrs. King (TV) as Raoul Nesbitt
 1987 The Rosary Murders as Lieutenant Koznicki
 1988 Dracula's Widow as Lannon
 1989 Chances Are as Judge Fenwick
 1989 Forced March as Father
 1989 Bloodhounds of Broadway as Waldo Winchester
 1990 The Kennedys of Massachusetts (TV) as Franklin D. Roosevelt
 1991 Shadows and Fog as Priest
 1992 Citizen Cohn (TV) as Albert Cohn
 1992 The Mighty Ducks as Gerald Ducksworth
 1993 Malice as Lester Adams
 1993 The Young Indiana Jones Chronicles (TV) as President Woodrow Wilson
 1994 Nobody's Fool as Clive Peoples Jr.
 1995 Strange Days as LAPD Commissioner Palmer Strickland
 1995 Moonlight and Valentino as Thomas Trager
 1996 The Chamber as Phelps Bowen
 1996-2000 Law & Order (TV) as Judge Hellman / Defence Attorney Patrick Rumsey 
 1997 Early Edition as John Dobbs
 1998 The Proposition as Father Dryer
 1998 Bulworth as Doctor (uncredited)
 1998 Lulu on the Bridge as Peter Shine (deleted scene) (uncredited)
 1998 Patch Adams as Dr. Eaton
 2000 Law & Order: Special Victims Unit (TV) as Defence Attorney Patrick Rumsey
 2000 The Next Best Thing as Richard Whittaker
 2000 Shaft as Curt Fleming
 2000 The Family Man as Peter Lassiter
 2002 The Sum of All Fears as Senator Jessup
 2002 Searching for Paradise as Carl Greenslate
 2002 Benjamin Franklin (TV) as Cotton Mather
 2003 Law & Order: Criminal Intent as Spencer Durning
 2004 The West Wing as Steve Gaines
 2006 The Elephant King as Bill Hunt
 2006 X-Men: The Last Stand as The President
 2007 The Invasion as Dr. Henryk Belicec
 2008 Stop-Loss as Senator Orton Worrell
 2010 The Other Guys (2010) as District Attorney Radford (uncredited)

References

External links

1934 births
People from Greifswald
American male film actors
American male television actors
German emigrants to the United States
Living people
Carnegie Mellon University College of Fine Arts alumni